Louis François Georges Baby,  (August 26, 1832 – May 13, 1906) was a Canadian politician and judge.

Born in Montreal, Lower Canada, he first ran for public office in the 1867 federal election in the Quebec riding of Joliette, but lost to François Benjamin Godin. A Conservative candidate, he was acclaimed in the 1872 elections. However, he was unseated by petition protesting the outcome of an election on June 11, 1874. He was re-elected in the resulting 1874 by-election and re-elected in 1878. From 1878 to 1880, he was the Minister of Inland Revenue. From 1881 to 1896, he was the judge of the Quebec Court of Appeal.

Baby was a notable collector of Canadian coins, medals, books, and manuscripts.

References

Further reading 

 Valerie E. Kirkman, Hervé Gagnon, Louis-François-George Baby: un bourgeois canadien-français du 19e siècle, 1832-1906. GGC Éditions, 2001

External links

1832 births
1906 deaths
Lawyers from Montreal
Judges in Quebec
Conservative Party of Canada (1867–1942) MPs
Members of the House of Commons of Canada from Quebec
Members of the King's Privy Council for Canada
Politicians from Montreal
Université Laval Faculté de droit alumni
Canadian numismatists
Knights Grand Cross of the Order of St Gregory the Great